The 2014–15 Stetson Hatters men's basketball team represented Stetson University during the 2014–15 NCAA Division I men's basketball season. The Hatters, led by second year head coach Corey Williams, played their home games at the Edmunds Center and were members of the Atlantic Sun Conference. They finished the season 9–22, 3–11 in A-Sun play to finish in last place. They lost in the quarterfinals of the A-Sun tournament to North Florida.

Roster

Schedule

 
|-
!colspan=9 style="background:#; color:#FFFFFF;"| Exhibition

|-
!colspan=9 style="background:#; color:#FFFFFF;"| Regular season

|-
!colspan=9 style="background:#; color:#FFFFFF;"| Atlantic Sun tournament

References

Stetson Hatters men's basketball seasons
Stetson
Stetson Hatters men's basketball
Stetson Hatters men's basketball